{{Infobox country
| native_name            = 
| conventional_long_name = Kingdom of Nepal
| common_name            = Nepal
| status                 = 
| life_span              = 1768–2008
| government_type        = Unitary absolute monarchy
 under military dictatorship
 under a totalitarian military dictatorship
Unitary authoritarian Panchayat absolute monarchyUnitary parliamentary constitutional monarchy
 under a provisional government
| year_start             = 1768
| year_end               = 2008
| event_start            = Unification under Prithivi Narayan Shah
| date_start             = 25 September
| event_end              = Republic
| date_end               = 28 May
| event1                 = Thapa premiers
| date_event1            = 1806–1837 and1843–1845
| event2                 = Pande premiers
| date_event2            = 1799–1804 and1837–1840
| event3                 = Rana regime
| date_event3            = 1846–1951
| event4                 = Panchayat system
| date_event4            = 1960–1990
| p1                     = Gorkha Kingdom1768:Gorkha Kingdom
| p2                     = Malla (Kathmandu Valley)1769:Malla Dynasty
| p3                     = Chaubisi Rajya1770s—1780s:Chaubisi Rajya| flag_p4                = Kirati flag.png
| p4                     = Kirat Region1774:Kirat Kingdom
| flag_p5                = Flag of Sikkim (1967-1975).svg
| p5                     = Kingdom of Sikkim1776:Kingdom of Sikkim
| p6                     = Baise rajya1780s:Baise Rajya
| p7                     = Doti Kingdom1791:Doti Kingdom
| flag_p8                = Flag of the Kumaon Kingdom.svg
| p8                     = Kumaon Kingdom
| flag_p9                = Flag of the Princely State of Tehri Garhwal.svg
| p9                     = Garhwal Kingdom 1804:Garhwal Kingdom
| s1                     = Garhwal Kingdom1816:Princely State of Tehri Garhwal
| flag_s1                = Flag of the Princely State of Tehri Garhwal.svg
| flag_s2                = Flag of Sikkim (1967-1975).svg
| s2                     = Kingdom of Sikkim
| flag_s3                = 
| flag_s4                = Flag of Nepal.svg
| s4                     = Nepal2008:Federal Democratic Republic of Nepal
| image_map              = Gorkha Empire 1805.jpg
| image_map_caption      = Territory of the Kingdom of Nepal in 1808
| image_map2             = Nepal rel location map.svg
| image_map2_caption     = Territory of the Kingdom of Nepal in 2008
| image_flag2            = Pre-1962 Flag of Nepal.svg
| flag_alt2              = Pre-1962 Flag of Nepal
| image_flag             = Flag of Nepal.svg
| flag_alt               = Flag of Nepal
| flag_width             = 85px
| flag_border            = no
| flag_type              = Top: Flag (1962–2008)Bottom: Flag (pre-1962)
| image_coat             = Coat of arms of Nepal (1962–2008).svg
| symbol_type            = Coat of arms(1962–2008)
| coa_size               = 100px
| national_motto         = Janani Janmabhumishcha Swargadapi Gariyasi (Sanskrit)Mother and Motherland are greater than heaven
| national_anthem        = 1962–2006:"Shriman Gambhir" (Nepali: श्रीमान् गम्भीर)()2007–2008:"Sayaun Thunga Phulka" (Nepali" सयौँ थुँगा फूलका)()
| capital                = Kathmandu
| common_languages       = Nepali (official)
| religion               = Hinduism (official)
| currency               = 
| title_leader           = Mahārājādhirāja (The Great King)
| leader1                = Prithvi Narayan Shah Dev 
| year_leader1           = 1768–1775
| leader2                = Gyanendra Bir Bikram Shah Dev 
| year_leader2           = 2001–2008
| deputy1                = Damodar Pande 
| year_deputy1           = 1799–1804
| deputy2                = Girija Prasad Koirala 
| year_deputy2           = 2006–2008
| title_deputy           = Prime Minister
| legislature            = 
| upper_house            = Senate(1959-1960)National Assembly(1990-2002)
| lower_house            = House of Representatives(1959-1960; 1990-2002)
| stat_year1             = 
| stat_area1             = 
| stat_pop1              = 
| today                  = NepalIndia
| footnotes              = 
| demonym                = NepaleseNepali
| area_km2               = 
| area_rank              = 
| GDP_PPP                = 
| GDP_PPP_year           = 
| HDI                    = 
| HDI_year               = 
| flag2_border           = no
| event5                 = Constitutional monarchy
| date_event5            = 1990–2008
| coordinates            = 
}}

The Kingdom of Nepal, also known as the Gorkha Empire or Asal Hindustan'(), was a Hindu kingdom in South Asia, formed in 1768, by the unification of Nepal. Founded by King Prithvi Narayan Shah, a Gorkha monarch  who claimed to be of Khas Thakuri origin, it existed for 240 years until the abolition of the Nepalese monarchy in 2008. During this period, Nepal was formally under the rule of the Shah dynasty, which exercised varying degrees of power during the kingdom's existence.
 
After the invasion of Tibet and plundering of Digarcha by Nepali forces under Prince Regent Bahadur Shah in 1792, the Dalai Lama and Chinese Ambans reported to the Chinese administration for military support. The Chinese and Tibetan forces under Fuk'anggan attacked Nepal but went for negotiations after failure at Nuwakot. Mulkaji Damodar Pande, who was the most influential among the four Kajis, was appointed after removal of Bahadur Shah.  Chief Kaji (Mulkaji) Kirtiman Singh Basnyat, tried to protect king Girvan Yuddha Shah and keep former king, Rana Bahadur Shah away from Nepal. However, on 4 March 1804, the former king came back and took over as Mukhtiyar (premier) and Damodar Pande was then beheaded in Thankot. The 1806 Bhandarkhal massacre instigated upon the death of Rana Bahadur Shah, set forth the rise of authoritative Mukhtiyar Bhimsen Thapa, who became the de facto ruler of Nepal from 1806 to 1837. During the early nineteenth century, however, the expansion of the East India Company's rule in India led to the Anglo-Nepalese War (1814–1816), which resulted in Nepal's defeat. Under the Treaty of Sugauli, the kingdom retained its internal independence, but in exchange for territorial concessions, marking the Mechi and Sharda rivers as the boundary of Nepalese territories. The territory of the kingdom before the Sugauli treaty is sometimes nascently referred to as Greater Nepal. In the political scenario, the death of Mukhtiyar Mathbar Singh Thapa ended the Thapa hegemony and set the stage for the Kot massacre. This resulted in the ascendancy of the Rana dynasty of Khas (Chhetri) and made the office of the Prime Minister of Nepal hereditary in their family for the next century, from 1843 to 1951. Beginning with Jung Bahadur, the first Rana ruler, the Rana dynasty reduced the Shah monarch to a figurehead role. The Rana rule was marked by tyranny, debauchery, economic exploitation and religious persecution.
 
In July 1950, the newly independent Republic of India signed a friendship treaty in which both nations agreed to respect the other's sovereignty. In November of the same year, India played an important role in supporting King Tribhuvan, whom the Rana leader Mohan Shumsher Jang Bahadur Rana had attempted to depose and replace with his infant grandson who would later become King Gyanendra. With Indian support for a new government consisting largely of the Nepali Congress, King Tribhuvan ended the Rana regime in 1951.
 
Unsuccessful attempts were made to implement reforms and adopt a constitution during the 1960s and 1970s. An economic crisis at the end of the 1980s led to a popular movement that brought about parliamentary elections and the adoption of a constitutional monarchy in 1990. The 1990s saw the beginning of the Nepalese Civil War (1996–2006), a conflict between government forces and the insurgent forces of the Communist Party of Nepal (Maoist). The situation of the Nepalese monarchy was further destabilised by the 2001 Nepalese royal massacre.
 
As a result of the massacre, King Gyanendra returned to the throne. His imposition of direct rule in 2005 provoked a protest movement unifying the Maoist insurgency and pro-democracy activists. He was eventually forced to restore the House of Representatives, which in 2007 adopted an interim constitution greatly restricting the powers of the Nepalese monarchy. Following an election held the next year, the Nepalese Constituent Assembly formally abolished the kingdom in its first session on 28 May 2008, declaring the Federal Democratic Republic of Nepal in its place.
 
Until the abolition of the monarchy, Nepal was the world's only country to have Hinduism as its state religion; since becoming a republic, the country is now formally a secular state.

History

18th century
Origins

The country was expanded from the one of the Chaubise principality called the Gorkha Kingdom. The Parbate Brahmins and the ruling Shah dynasty as well as the Chhetri (Kshatriya) aristocratic clans such as the Pande family, Basnyat family, Thapa dynasty and Kunwar family (later Rana dynasty) among the Gorkhali people trace their ancestry to the Hindu Rajputs and Brahmins of Northern India who entered modern Nepal from the West following Muslim advances. The actual historical process however by which this migration took place and the history of the Gorkhalis' ultimate conquest of Nepal span a couple of centuries and are drastically different from what Chauhan proposes. More importantly, Chauhan's overall thesis claiming the existence of a Gurkha identity way before the Shahs came to the Nepali hills is not supported by historical evidence available in Nepal. In Nepal, the warrior people are not referred to as 'Gurkhas', they are called 'Gorkhalis', meaning the 'inhabitants of Gorkha.' Their famed battle cry is "Jai Kali, Jai Gorakhnath, Jai Manakamana".
 
The etymology of the geographical name 'Gorkha' is indeed related to the Hindu mendicant-saint Gorakhnath. In the village of Gorkha is situated a temple dedicated to Gorakhnath as well as another dedicated to Gorakhkali, a corresponding female deity. The Nepali geographical encyclopedia 'Mechi dekhi Mahakali' (From Mechi to Mahakali) published in B.S. 2013 (1974–75 AD) by the authoritarian Panchayat government to mark the coronation of King Birendra Shah agrees with the association of the name of the place with the saint but does not add any further detail. The facts regarding when the temples were built and the place named after the saint are lost in the sweeping winds of time. We may guess that these developments took place in the early part of the second millennium of the Common Era following the rise of the Nath sect. In fact, the pilgrimage circuit of the sect across the northern Indian sub-continent also spans a major part Nepal including Kathmandu Valley. The Newars of Medieval Nepal have a couple of important temples and festivals dedicated to the major Nath teachers. Immediately before the rule of Gorkha by the Shahs, Gorkha was inhabited by both Aryan and Mongoloid ethnic groups and ruled by the Khadkas, who were probably of Magar origin. Dravya Shah defeated the Khadkas in 1559 AD and commenced Shah rule over the principality. Prithvi Narayan Shah belonged to the ninth generation of the Shahs in Gorkha. He took the reins of power in 1742 AD.

Expansion

King Prithvi Narayan Shah, the ruler of the small principality of Gorkha, initially drafted the Gorkhali Army. The Chief of the Gorkhali Army were drawn from Chhetri noble families of Gorkha such as Pande family, Basnyat family and Thapa dynasty before the rule of the Rana dynasty. However, the first civilian army chief was Kaji Kalu Pande who had significant role in the campaign of Nepal. He was considered as an army head due to the undertaking of duties and responsibilities of the army but not by the formalization of the title.

Battle of Nuwakot

The first battle by Gorkhali forces united under King Prithvi Narayan Shah was the Battle of Nuwakot. The first army commander was Kaji Kalu Pande of the Pande noble family of Gorkha. Pande put up tactics to attack Nuwakot, a strategic fort of Malla king of Kathmandu, from multiple sides by surprise. On 26 September 1744, Pande with a contingent of soldiers climbed from the northern side of Nuwakot city at Mahamandal. He led the surprise attack with a Gorkhali war cry of "Jai Kali, Jai Gorakhnath, Jai Manakamana". The panicked soldiers of Nuwakot under commander Shankha Mani tried to defend but lost after their commander was killed by the 13-year-old Prince Dal Mardan Shah, brother of the king. The second contingent of Gorkhali forces led by Chautariya Mahoddam Kirti Shah (also a brother of the king) passed Dharampani and faced strong tussle but ultimately won over the defenders. The third part of the forces, led by the king himself, advanced to the fort of Nuwakotgadhi after the capture of Mahamandal. The soldiers panicked by death of their commander fled to Belkot from the Nuwakot fort and Nuwakot was annexed by Gorkha.

Battle of Kirtipur

Despite his initial resentment that the valley kings were well prepared and the Gorkhalis were not, Kaji Kalu Pande agreed for a battle against the kingdom of Kirtipur in the Kathmandu valley on being insisted by the king. The Gorkhalis had set up a base in Naikap to mount their assaults on Kirtipur. They were armed with swords, bows and arrows and muskets. The two forces fought on the plain of Tyangla Phant in the northwest of Kirtipur. Surapratap Shah, the king's brother, lost his right eye to an arrow while scaling the city wall. The Gorkhali commander Kaji Kalu Pande was surrounded and killed, and the Gorkhali king himself narrowly escaped with his life into the surrounding hills disguised as a saint. Page 227. In 1767, King Prithvi Narayan Shah sent his army to attack Kirtipur for a third time under the command of Surapratap. In response, the three kings of the valley joined forces and sent their troops to the relief of Kirtipur, but they could not dislodge the Gorkhalis from their positions. A noble of Lalitpur named Danuvanta crossed over to Shah's side and treacherously let the Gorkhalis into the town.

Annexation of Makwanpur & Hariharpur
King Digbardhan Sen and his minister Kanak Singh Baniya had already sent their families to safer grounds before the encirclement of their fortress. The Gorkhalis launched an attack on 21 August 1762. The battle lasted for eight hours. King Digbardhan and Kanak Singh escaped to Hariharpurgadhi. Makawanpur was thus annexed by the Gorkhali forces.
 
After occupying the Makawanpurgadhi fort, the Gorkhali forces started planning for an attack on Hariharpurgadhi, a strategic fort on a mountain ridge of the Mahabharat range south of Kathmandu. It controlled the route to the Kathmandu valley. At the dusk of 4 October 1762, the Gorkhalis launched an attack. The soldiers at Hariharpurgadhi fought valiantly against the Gorkhali forces but were ultimately forced to vacate the Gadhi (fort) after midnight. About 500 soldiers of Hariharpur died in the battle. Mir Qasim, the Nawab of Bengal extended his help to kings of Kathmandu valley with his forces to attack the Gorkhali forces. On 20 January 1763, Gorkhali commander Vamsharaj Pande won the battle against Mir Qasim. Similarly, Captain Kinloch of British East India Company also extended his support by sending contingents against Gorkhalis. King Prithvi Narayan sent Kaji Vamsharaj Pande, Naahar Singh Basnyat, Jeeva Shah, Ram Krishna Kunwar and others to defeat the forces of Gurgin Khan at Makwanpur.

Conquest of Kathmandu valley and Declaration of Kingdom of Nepal
The victory in the Battle of Kirtipur climaxed Shah's two-decade-long effort to take possession of the wealthy Kathmandu valley. After the fall of Kirtipur, Shah took over the cities of Kathmandu and Lalitpur in 1768 and Bhaktapur in 1769, completing his conquest of the valley. In a letter to Ram Krishna Kunwar, King Prithvi Narayan Shah expressed his unhappiness at the death of Kaji Kalu Pande in Kirtipur and thought it was impossible to conquer Kathmandu valley after the death of Kalu Pande. After the annexation of Kathmandu valley, King Prithvi Narayan Shah praised in his letter about the valour and wisdom shown by Kunwar in the annexation of Kathmandu, Lalitpur and Bhaktapur (collectively known as Nepal valley at the time). Vamsharaj Pande, Kalu Pande's eldest son, was the commander of the Gorkhali forces who led the attack during the Battle of Bhaktapur on 14 April 1769.

Conquest of the Kirata

King Prithvi Narayan Shah had deployed Sardar Ram Krishna Kunwar to the invasion of Kirata regional areas comprising; Pallo Kirant (Limbuwan), Wallo Kirant and Majh Kirant (Khambuwan). On B.S. 1829 Bhadra 13 (i.e. 29 August 1772), Kunwar crossed the Dudhkoshi river to invade King Karna Sen of the Majh Kirant (Khambuwan) and Saptari region with fellow commander Abhiman Singh Basnyat. He then crossed the Arun river to reach Chainpur (Limbuwan), where he later achieved victory over the Kiratas. King Prithvi Narayan Shah bestowed 22 pairs of Shirpau (special headgear) in appreciation to Ram Krishna Kunwar after his victory over the Kirata region.

 Political conflicts 
In 1775, the King Prithvi Narayan Shah, who expanded the Gorkha Kingdom into the Kingdom of Nepal, died in Nuwakot. Swarup Singh Karki, a shrewd Gorkhali courtier from a Chhetri family of eastern Nepal, marched with an army to Nuwakot to confine Prince Bahadur Shah who was then mourning the death of his father. He confined Bahadur Shah and Dal Mardan Shah with the consent from newly reigning King Pratap Singh Shah who was considered to have no distinction of right and wrong. In the annual Pajani (renewal) of that year, Swarup Singh was promoted to the position of Kaji along with Abhiman Singh Basnyat, Amar Singh Thapa and Parashuram Thapa. In Falgun 1832 B.S., he succeeded in exiling Bahadur Shah, Dal Mardan Shah and Guru Gajraj Mishra on three heinous charges. The reign of Pratap Singh Shah was characterized by the constant rivalry between Swarup Singh and Vamsharaj Pande. The document dated B.S. 1833 Bhadra 3 Roj 6 (i.e. Friday, 2 August 1776), shows that he had carried the title of Dewan along with Vamsharaj Pande. King Pratap Singh Shah died on 22 November 1777 with his infant son Rana Bahadur Shah succeeding as the King of Nepal. Sarbajit Rana Magar was made a Kaji along with Balbhadra Shah and Vamsharaj Pande while Daljit Shah was chosen as Chief Chautariya. Historian Dilli Raman Regmi asserts that Sarbajit was chosen as Mulkaji (equivalent to Prime Minister), while historian Rishikesh Shah asserts that Sarbajit was the head of the Nepalese government only for a short period in 1778. Afterwards, rivalry arose between Prince Bahadur Shah and Queen Rajendra Laxmi. Sarbajit led the followers of the Queen opposed to Sriharsh Pant who led the followers of Bahadur Shah. The group of Bharadars (officers) led by Sarbajit badmouthed Rajendra Laxmi against Bahadur Shah. Rajendra Laxmi succeeded in the confinement of Bahadur Shah with the help of her new minister Sarbajit. Guru Gajraj Mishra came to the rescue of Bahadur Shah on a condition that Bahadur Shah should leave the country. Also, his rival Sriharsh Pant was branded outcast and expelled instead of being executed as execution was prohibited for Brahmins.
 
Prince Bahadur Shah confined his sister-in-law Queen Rajendra Laxmi on the charge of having illicit relation with Sarbajit on 31 August 1778. Subsequently, Sarbajit was executed inside the palace by Bahadur Shah with the help of male servants of the royal palace. Historian Bhadra Ratna Bajracharya asserts that it was actually Chautariya Daljit Shah who led the opposing group against Sarbajit Rana and Rajendra Laxmi. The letter dated B.S. 1835 Bhadra 11 Roj 4 (1778) to Narayan Malla and Vrajabasi Pande asserts the death of Sarbajit under misconduct and the appointment of Bahadur Shah as regent. The death of Sarbajit Rana Magar is considered to have marked the initiation of court conspiracies and massacres in the newly unified Kingdom of Nepal. Historian Baburam Acharya points that the sanctions against Queen Rajendra Laxmi under moral misconduct was a mistake of Bahadur Shah. Similarly, the murder of Sarbajit was condemned by many historians as an act of injustice.
 
Vamsharaj Pande, once Dewan of Nepal and son of the popular commander Kalu Pande, was beheaded on the allegations of conspiring with Queen Rajendra Laxmi. In a special tribunal meeting at Bhandarkhal garden east of Kathmandu Durbar, Swaroop Singh held Vamsharaj liable for letting the King of Parbat, Kirtibam Malla, run away in the battle a year ago. He had a fiery conversation with Vamsharaj before Vamsharaj was declared guilty and was subsequently executed by beheading on the tribunal. Historian Rishikesh Shah and Ganga Karmacharya claim that he was executed in March 1785, whereas Bhadra Ratna Bajracharya and Tulsi Ram Vaidya claim that he was executed on 21 April 1785. On 2 July 1785, Swaroop Singh's opponent Prince Regent Bahadur Shah was arrested, but on the eleventh day of imprisonment, on 13 July, Singh's only supporter Queen Rajendra Laxmi died. Then onwards, Bahadur Shah took over the regency of his nephew King Rana Bahadur Shah and as one of his first orders as the regent, he ordered Swaroop Singh, who was then in Pokhara, to be beheaded there on the charges of treason. Singh had gone to Kaski to join Daljit Shah's military campaign of Kaski fearing retaliation of the old courtiers due to his conspiracy against Vamsharaj. He was executed on B.S. 1842 Shrawan 24.

Tibetan conflict

After the death of Prithvi Narayan Shah, the Shah dynasty began to expand their kingdom into what is present-day North India. Between 1788 and 1791, Nepal invaded Tibet and robbed Tashi Lhunpo Monastery of Shigatse. Tibet sought Chinese help and the Qianlong Emperor of the Chinese Qing Dynasty appointed Fuk'anggan commander-in-chief of the Tibetan campaign. Heavy damages were inflicted on both sides. The Nepali forces retreated step by step back to Nuwakot to stretch Sino-Tibetan forces uncomfortably. Chinese launched an uphill attack during the daylight and failed to succeed due to a strong counterattack with khukuri at Nuwakot. The Chinese army suffered a major setback when they tried to cross a monsoon-flooded Betrawati, close to the Gorkhali palace in Nuwakot. A stalemate ensued when Fuk'anggan was keen to protect his troops and wanted to negotiate at Nuwakot. The treaty was favouring more to Chinese side where Nepal had to send tributes to the Chinese emperor.

19th century

Dominance of Damodar Pande

 
Damodar Pande was appointed as one of the four Kajis by King Rana Bahadur Shah after the removal of Chautariya Bahadur Shah in 1794. Pande was the most influential and dominant amongst the court factions in spite of the post of Mulkaji being held by Kirtiman Singh Basnyat. Pandes were the most dominant noble family. Later due to the continuous irrational behaviour of King Rana Bahadur Shah, a situation of civil war arose where Damodar was the main opposition to the King. He was forced to flee to the British-controlled city of Varanasi in May 1800 after the military parted with influential Kaji Damodar Pande. After Queen Rajrajeshwari finally managed to assume the regency on 17 December 1802, later in February she appointed Damodar Pande as the Mulkaji.
 
After Rana Bahadur's reinstatement to power, he ordered Damodar Pande, along with his two eldest sons, who were completely innocent, to be executed on 13 March 1804; similarly, some members of his faction were tortured and executed without any due trial, while many others managed to escape to India. Among those who managed to escape to India were Damodar Pande's sons Karbir Pande and Rana Jang Pande. After Damodar Pande's execution, Ranajit Pande who was his paternal cousin, was appointed Mulkaji along with Bhimsen Thapa as second Kaji, Sher Bahadur Shah as Mul Chautariya and Ranganath Paudel as Raj Guru (Royal Preceptor).

Thapa Regime

Thapa courtiers, who were Kshatriya, rose to power when the King Rana Bahadur Shah was murdered by his half brother Sher Bahadur Shah in 1806. Bhimsen Thapa (1775–1839), the leading Thapa Kaji, taking opportunity of the occasion massacred nearly 55 military and civil officers and catapulting the Thapas into the power. He took the title of Mukhtiyar succeeding Rana Bahadur as the chief authority and his niece Queen Tripurasundari as Queen Regent of junior King Girvan Yuddha Bikram Shah.

Anglo-Gurkha War

Rivalry between Nepal and the East India Company—over the princely states bordering Nepal and India—eventually led to the Anglo-Nepalese War (1814–16). The Treaty of Sugauli was signed in 1816, ceding large parts of the Nepali territories of the Terai and Sikkim, which accounted to nearly one-third of the country, to the British in exchange for Nepalese autonomy. As the territories were not restored to Nepal by the British when freedom was granted to the people of British India, most of these lands later became a part of the Republic of India. Sikkim remained independent until annexed into India in 1975 when it becomes the 22nd state of the Republic of India. However, in 1860 the British returned the authority over some of Nepal's land in the Terai back to Nepal (known as Naya Muluk, new country) as an act of gratitude for supporting Britain during various Indian uprisings, such as the Sepoy mutiny.

Rana Regime

Factionalism among the royal family led to a period of instability after the war. In 1846, Queen Rajya Lakshmi Devi plotted to overthrow Jang Bahadur Rana, a fast-rising military leader who was presenting a threat to her power. The plot was uncovered and the queen had several hundred princes and chieftains executed after an armed clash between military personnel and administrators loyal to the queen. This came to be known as the Kot Massacre. However, Jung Bahadur emerged victorious eventually and founded the Rana dynasty; the monarch was made a titular figure, and the post of Prime Minister was made powerful and hereditary, held by the Ranas.

 Third Nepalese Tibet War 

Jung Bahadur Rana sent forces under his brothers Bam Bahadur Kunwar and Dhir Shamsher Rana to attack Tibet again to achieve complete victory. His forces succeeded in defeating Tibetan forces on two sides. The Tibetan team arrived in January 1856 to sign a treaty. After a month, the Treaty of Thapathali was signed which was more favourable to Nepal.

20th century

 Nepal and the British 
The Rana regime, a tightly centralized autocracy, pursued a policy of isolating Nepal from external influences. This policy helped Nepal maintain its national independence during the British colonial era, but it also impeded the country's economic development and modernisation. The Ranas were staunchly pro-British and assisted the British during the Indian Rebellion of 1857 and later in both World Wars. At the same time, despite Chinese claims, the British supported Nepalese independence at the beginning of the twentieth century.
 
In December 1923, Britain and Nepal formally signed a treaty of perpetual peace and friendship superseding the Sugauli Treaty of 1816 and upgrading the British resident in Kathmandu to an envoy. Slavery was abolished in Nepal in 1924.

Democratic reform

 
Popular dissatisfaction against the family rule of the Ranas had started emerging from among the few educated people, who had studied in various Indian schools and colleges, and also from within the Ranas, many of whom were marginalised within the ruling Rana hierarchy. Many of these Nepalese in exile had actively taken part in the Indian Independence struggle and wanted to liberate Nepal as well from the internal autocratic Rana occupation. The political parties such as the Praja Parishad and Nepali Congress were already formed in exile by leaders such as B.P. Koirala, Ganesh Man Singh, Subarna Shamsher Rana, Krishna Prasad Bhattarai, Girija Prasad Koirala and many other patriotic-minded Nepalis who urged the military and popular political movement in Nepal to overthrow the autocratic Rana Regime. Among the prominent martyrs to die for the cause, executed at the hands of the Ranas, were Dharma Bhakta Mathema, Shukraraj Shastri, Gangalal Shrestha and Dasharath Chand. This turmoil culminated in King Tribhuvan, a direct descendant of Prithvi Narayan Shah, fleeing from his 'palace prison' in 1950, to the newly independent India, touching off an armed revolt against the Rana administration. This eventually ended in the return of the Shah family to power and the appointment of a non-Rana as prime minister. A period of the quasi-constitutional rule followed, during which the monarch, assisted by the leaders of fledgling political parties, governed the country. During the 1950s, efforts were made to frame a constitution for Nepal that would establish a representative form of government, based on a British model.
 
In early 1959, Tribhuvan's son King Mahendra issued a new constitution, and the first democratic elections for a national assembly were held. The Nepali Congress, a moderate socialist group, gained a substantial victory in the election. Its leader, B.P. Koirala, formed a government and served as prime minister. After a period of power wrangling between the king and the elected government, Mahendra dissolved the democratic experiment in 1960.

King Mahendra's new constitution

Declaring the contemporary parliament a failure, King Mahendra in 1960 dismissed the Koirala government, declared that a "partyless" Panchayat system would govern Nepal, and promulgated another new constitution on 16 December 1962.
 
Subsequently, the Prime Minister, members of parliament and hundreds of democratic activists were arrested. In fact, this trend of the arrest of political activists and democratic supporters continued for the entire 30-year period of the partyless Panchayat system under King Mahendra and then his son, King Birendra.
 
The new constitution established a "partyless" system of panchayats (councils), which King Mahendra considered to be a democratic form of government, closer to Nepalese traditions. As a pyramidal structure, progressing from village assemblies to a Rastriya Panchayat (National Parliament), the panchayat system constitutionalised the absolute power of the monarchy and kept the King as head of state with sole authority over all governmental institutions, including the cabinet (council of ministers) and the parliament. One-state-one-language became the national policy, and all other languages suffered at the cost of the official language, Nepali, which was the king's language.
 
King Mahendra was succeeded by his 27-year-old son, King Birendra, in 1972. Amid student demonstrations and anti-regime activities in 1979, King Birendra called for a national referendum to decide on the nature of Nepal's government: either the continuation of the panchayat system with democratic reforms or the establishment of a multiparty system. The referendum was held in May 1980, and the Panchayat system won a narrow victory. The king carried out the promised reforms, including a selection of the prime minister by the Rashtriya Panchayat.

End of Panchayat system
There was resentment against the authoritarian regime and the curbs on the freedom of the political parties. There was a widespread feeling of the palace being non-representative of the masses, especially when the Marich Man Singh government faced political scandals on charges of misappropriation of funds allotted for the victims of the earthquake in August 1998 or when it reshuffled the cabinet instead of investigating the deaths of the people in a stampede in the national sports complex in a hailstorm. Also, the souring of the India-Nepal trade relations affected the popularity of the Singh government.
 
In April 1987, Nepal had introduced the work permit for Indian workers in three of its districts, and in early 1989, Nepal provided 40% duty concession to Chinese goods and later withdrew duty concessions from Indian goods in such a manner that the Chinese goods became cheaper than the Indian goods. This led to the souring of relations which were already strained over the purchase of Chinese arms by Nepal in 1988. India refused to renew two separate Treaties of Trade and Transit and insisted on a single treaty dealing with the two issues, which was not acceptable to Nepal. A deadlock ensued and the Treaties of Trade and Transit expired on 23 March 1989. The brunt of the closure of the trade and transit points was mainly faced by the lower classes in Nepal due to the restricted supply of consumer goods and petroleum products such as petrol, aviation fuel and kerosene. The industries suffered because of their dependence on India for resources, trade and transit. The Government of Nepal tried to deal with the situation by depending on foreign aid from the US, UK, Australia and China. However, the government's strategy to manage the crisis could not satisfy those people who desired negotiations with India rather than dependence on foreign aid as a solution.
 
Taking advantage of the uneasiness amongst some people against the government and the strained India-Nepal relations, the Nepali Congress (NC) and the left-wing parties blamed the government for perpetuating the crisis and not taking any serious measures to solve it. In December 1989, the NC tried to utilize B.P. Koirala's anniversary by launching a people's awareness program. The left-wing alliance known as the United Left Front (ULF) extended its support to the NC in its campaign for a party system. On 18–19 January 1990, the NC held a conference in which leaders from various countries and members of the foreign Press were invited. Leaders from India attended the conference; Germany, Japan, Spain, Finland supported the movement; and the Embassies of the US and West Germany were present on the occasion. Inspired by the international support and the democratic movements occurring throughout the world after the disintegration of the Soviet Union in 1989, the NC and the ULF launched a mass movement on 18 February to end the Panchayat regime and the installation of an interim government represented by various parties and people.
 
On 6 April the Marich Man Singh government was dismissed and Lokendra Bahadur Chand became the Prime Minister on the same day. However, the agitating mob was not satisfied with the change of government as they were not against the Singh government per se but against the party-less system. On 16 April the Chand government was also dismissed and a Royal Proclamation was issued the next day which dissolved the National Panchayat, the Panchayat policy and the evaluation committee and the class organizations. Instead, the proclamation declared "functioning of the political parties" and maintained that "all political parties will always keep the national interest uppermost in organizing themselves according to their political ideology." 
During this protest many civilians were killed: after the end of the Panchayat rule they were seen as 'undeclared martyrs'. One of those martyrs is Ram Chandra Hamal, a member of the Nepali Congress and killed during his imprisonment.

1990 People's Movement

People in rural areas had expected that their interests would be better represented after the adoption of parliamentary democracy in 1990. The Nepali Congress with the support of "Alliance of leftist parties" decided to launch a decisive agitational movement, Jana Andolan, which forced the monarchy to accept constitutional reforms and to establish a multiparty parliament. In May 1991, Nepal held its first parliamentary elections in nearly 50 years. The Nepali Congress won 110 of the 205 seats and formed the first elected government in 32 years.

Civil strife
In 1992, in a situation of economic crisis and chaos, with spiraling prices as a result of the implementation of changes in the policy of the new Congress government, the radical left stepped up their political agitation. A Joint People's Agitation Committee was set up by the various groups. A general strike was called for 6 April.
 
Violent incidents began to occur on the evening before the strike. The Joint People's Agitation Committee had called for a 30-minute 'lights out' in the capital, and violence erupted outside Bir Hospital when activists tried to enforce the 'lights out'. At dawn on 6 April, clashes between strike activists and police, outside a police station in Pulchok (Patan), left two activists dead.
 
Later in the day, a mass rally of the Agitation Committee at Tundikhel in the capital Kathmandu was attacked by police forces. As a result, riots broke out and the Nepal Telecommunications building was set on fire; police opened fire at the crowd, killing several persons. The Human Rights Organisation of Nepal estimated that 14 persons, including several onlookers, had been killed in police firing.
 
When promised land reforms failed to appear, people in some districts started to organize to enact their own land reform and to gain some power over their lives in the face of usurious landlords. However, this movement was repressed by the Nepali government, in Operation Romeo and Operation Kilo Sera II, which took the lives of many of the leading activists of the struggle. As a result, many witnesses to this repression became radicalised.

Nepalese Civil War

In February 1996, one of the Maoist parties started a bid to replace the parliamentary monarchy with a people's new democratic republic, through a Maoist revolutionary strategy known as the people's war, which led to the Nepalese Civil War. Led by Dr. Baburam Bhattarai and Pushpa Kamal Dahal (better known by his nom de guerre "Prachanda"), the insurgency began in five districts in Nepal: Rolpa, Rukum, Jajarkot, Gorkha, and Sindhuli. The Maoists declared the existence of a provisional "people's government" at the district level in several locations.

21st century

Palace massacre

On 1 June 2001, Crown Prince Dipendra allegedly went on a shooting-spree, assassinating 9 members of the royal family, including King Birendra and Queen Aishwarya, before shooting himself. Due to his survival, he temporarily became king before dying of his wounds, after which Prince Gyanendra (Birendra's brother) inherited the throne, according to tradition. The massacre shattered the aura of mythology that still surrounded the Royal Family, exposing their far too human intrigues.
 
Meanwhile, the Maoist rebellion escalated, and in October 2002 the king temporarily deposed the government and took complete control of it. A week later he reappointed another government, but the country was still unstable because of the civil war with the Maoists, the various clamouring political factions, the king's attempts to take more control of the government, and worries about the competence of Gyanendra's son and heir, Prince Paras.

Suspension of responsible government
In the face of unstable governments and a Maoist siege on the Kathmandu Valley in August 2004, popular support for the monarchy began to wane. On 1 February 2005, Gyanendra dismissed the entire government and took to exercising his executive powers without ministerial advice, declaring a "state of emergency" to quash the Maoist movement. Politicians were placed under house arrest, phone and internet lines were cut, and freedom of the press was severely curtailed.

2006 democracy movement

 
The king's new regime made little progress in his stated aim of suppressing the insurgents. The European Union described the municipal elections of February 2006 as "a backward step for democracy", as the major parties boycotted the election and the army forced some candidates to run for office. In April 2006 strikes and street protests in Kathmandu forced the king to reinstate the parliament. A seven-party coalition resumed control of the government and stripped the king of most of his powers. As of 15 January 2007, a unicameral legislature under an interim constitution governed Nepal.

Abolition of the monarchy
The Constituent Assembly came to fruition on 24 December 2007 when it was announced that the monarchy would be abolished in 2008 after the Constituent Assembly elections; and on 28 May 2008, Nepal was declared a Federal Democratic Republic.

Zones, districts, and regions

 
Nepal was divided into 14 zones and 75 districts, grouped into 5 development regions. Each district was headed by a fixed chief district officer responsible for maintaining law and order and coordinating the work of field agencies of the various government ministries. The 14 zones were:

Government and politics

Until 1990, Nepal was an absolute monarchy running under the executive control of the king. Faced with a people's movement against the absolute monarchy, King Birendra, in 1990, agreed to large-scale political reforms by creating a parliamentary monarchy with the king as the head of state and a prime minister as the head of the government.
 
Nepal's legislature was bicameral consisting of a House of Representatives and a National Council. The House of Representatives consists of 205 members directly elected by the people. The National Council had sixty members, ten nominated by the king, thirty-five elected by the House of Representatives and the remaining fifteen elected by an electoral college made up of chairs of villages and towns. The legislature had a five-year term but was dissolvable by the king before its term could end. All Nepali citizens 18 years and older became eligible to vote.
 
The executive comprised the King and the Council of Ministers (the Cabinet). The leader of the coalition or party securing the maximum seats in an election was appointed as the Prime Minister. The Cabinet was appointed by the king on the recommendation of the Prime Minister. Governments in Nepal have tended to be highly unstable; no government has survived for more than two years since 1991, either through internal collapse or parliamentary dissolution by the monarch on the recommendation of the prime minister according to the constitution.
 
The movement in April 2006 brought about a change in the nation. The autocratic King was forced to give up power. The dissolved House of Representatives was restored. The House of Representatives formed a government that had successful peace talks with the Maoist Rebels. An interim constitution was promulgated and an interim House of Representatives was formed with Maoist members. The number of seats was also increased to 330. The peace process in Nepal made a giant leap in April 2007, when the Communist Party of Nepal (Maoist) joined the interim government of Nepal.

Notes

 References 
 Citations 

 Sources 

 
 
 
 
 
 
 
 
 
 
 
 
 
 
 
 
 
 

 Further reading 
 Garzilli, Enrica, "A Sanskrit Letter Written by Sylvain Lévi in 1923 to Hemarāja Śarmā Along With Some Hitherto Unknown Biographical Notes (Cultural Nationalism and Internationalism in the First Half of the 21st Cent.: Famous Indologists Write to the Raj Guru of Nepal – no. 1), in Commemorative Volume for 30 Years of the Nepal-German Manuscript Preservation Project. Journal of the Nepal Research Centre, XII (2001), Kathmandu, ed. by A. Wezler in collaboration with H. Haffner, A. Michaels, B. Kölver, M. R. Pant and D. Jackson, pp. 115–149.
 Garzilli, Enrica, "Strage a palazzo, movimento dei Maoisti e crisi di governabilità in Nepal", in Asia Major 2002, pp. 143–160.
 Garzilli, Enrica, "Il nuovo Stato del Nepal: il difficile cammino dalla monarchia assoluta alla democrazia", in Asia Major 2005–2006, pp. 229–251.
 Garzilli, Enrica, "Il Nepal da monarchia a stato federale", in Asia Major 2008, pp. 163–181.
 Garzilli, Enrica, "La fine dell'isolamento del Nepal, la costruzione della sua identità politica e delle sue alleanze regionali" in ISPI: Istituto per gli Studi di Politica Internazionali, CVII (Nov. 2008), pp. 1–7;
 Garzilli, Enrica, "Le elezioni dell'Assemblea Costituente e i primi mesi di governo della Repubblica Democratica Federale del Nepal", in Asia Maior 2010, pp. 115–126.
 Garzilli, Enrica, "Nepal, la difficile costruzione della nazione: un paese senza Costituzione e un parlamento senza primo ministro", in Asia Maior 2011, pp. 161–171.
 Garzilli, Enrica, "The Interplay between Gender, Religion and Politics, and the New Violence against Women in Nepal", in J. Dragsbæk Schmidt and T. Roedel Berg (eds.), Gender, Social Change and the Media: Perspective from Nepal, University of Aalborg and Rawat Publications, Aalborg-Jaipur: 2012, pp. 27–91.
 Garzilli, Enrica, "Nepal, stallo politico e lentezze nella realizzazione del processo di pace e di riconciliazione", in Asia Maior 2012, pp. 213–222.
 Garzilli, Enrica, "A Sanskrit Letter Written by Sylvain Lévy in 1925 to Hemarāja Śarmā along with Some Hitherto Unknown Biographical Notes (Cultural Nationalism and Internationalism in the First Half of the 20th Century – Famous Indologists write to the Raj Guru of Nepal – No. 2)", in History of Indological Studies. Papers of the 12th World Sanskrit Conference Vol. 11.2, ed. by K. Karttunen, P. Koskikallio and A. Parpola, Motilal Banarsidass and University of Helsinki, Delhi 2015, pp. 17–53.
 Garzilli, Enrica, "Nepal 2013–2014: Breaking the Political Impasse", in Asia Maior 2014, pp. 87–98.
 Wright, Daniel, History of Nepal''. New Delhi-Madras, Asian Educational Services, 1990
 

 
Kingdom of Nepal
Kingdom of Nepal
Former kingdoms
Kingdom of Nepal
.
Kingdom of Nepal
Kingdom of Nepal
Kingdom of Nepal
Kingdom of Nepal
Kingdom of Nepal
Kingdom of Nepal
Kingdom of Nepal
Kingdom of Nepal
Kingdom of Nepal
Kingdom of Nepal
Empires and kingdoms of Nepal